or  or  is a lake on the border between Norway and Sweden. Most of the lake lies in Hemnes Municipality in Nordland county (Norway) and then a small portion crosses the border into Storuman Municipality in Västerbotten County (Sweden). The lake is one of the upper reservoirs for the Bjerka Hydroelectric Power Station.

See also
 List of lakes in Norway
 Geography of Norway

References

Hemnes
Lakes of Nordland
Lakes of Västerbotten County
Norway–Sweden border
International lakes of Europe